Kollupitiya, also known as Colpetty is a major neighbourhood of Colombo, Sri Lanka. The name Kollupitiya comes from the name of a chief from Kandy who had unsuccessfully attempted to dethrone the last king of Kandy. During the period of British and Dutch administration, a brewery had commenced in Kollupitiya which converted coconut treacle into liquor. Nowadays, the suburb is a thriving commercial area containing fashionable high-end shopping malls. Some foreign embassies are located in Kollupitiya. The Prime Minister's House (Colombo) is located in Colombo 3 just two blocks south of Maha Nuge Gardens; a prominent private laneway in Kollupitiya.

Demographic 
Kollupitiya is a multi-religious and multi-ethnic area. The major ethnic communities in Kollupitiya are Sri Lankan Moors, Sinhalese, and Sri Lankan Tamils. There are also various minorities, such as Burghers. Religions include Buddhism, Hinduism, Islam, and Christianity.

Muslim traders form a large part of the Kollupitiya economy with many businesses being operated by the local Sri Lankan Moors. In recent years, the influx of Chinese expatriates to Colombo has led to an increase of Chinese shops and businesses in the area. Many Chinese expatriates have opened shops and other businesses that cater towards the Chinese expatriate community. Some Sri Lankan residents of Kollupitiya have also been influenced by the influx of Chinese people to the area by shopping at the Chinese-run businesses and even picking up aspects of Mandarin Chinese.

Schools 
There are several government and private schools located in Kollupitiya. They are:
 Bishop's College
 Mahanama College
 Methodist College Colombo
 S. Thomas' Preparatory School

Diplomatic Missions
 Honorary Consulate General of Finland 
 Embassy of Germany
 Honorary Consulate of Belgium (België/Belgique/Belgien)
 High Commission of the Republic of India
 High Commission of Malaysia
 Honorary Consulate of Malta
 Embassy of the United States of America and American Centre
 Honorary Consulate of Bosnia and Herzegovina
 Honorary Consulate of Botswana
 Honorary Consulate of Chile
Embassy of The Sultanate of Oman

Government Offices
 Temple Trees (presidential residence)
 National Savings Bank Head Office (Savings House)
 Sri Lanka Tourism headquarters
 Civil Aviation Authority of Sri Lanka
 Department of Economic Development

See also 
 Marine Drive Tunnel

References 

Districts of Colombo
Populated places in Western Province, Sri Lanka